"Down the Field" is the title of two different fight songs in college football. One is used by Yale University and the University of Tennessee; the other is used by Syracuse University.

Yale’s “Down the Field” was written in 1904 by Yale undergraduate Stanleigh P. Friedman, the manager of Yale’s orchestra (music); and Yale law student Caleb W. O’Connor (lyrics). According to Yale Bands, the song is "played at the end of every Yale athletic event, win or lose."

The Yale fight song was adapted with new lyrics by Robert Clayton “Red” Matthews, an engineering professor at the University of Tennessee in Knoxville, Tennessee. Matthews’ version became the official fight song of the university. However, "Rocky Top" is frequently played at the university, making it the unofficial fight song, and is a favorite among fans. Whenever the Volunteers score a touchdown, "Down the Field" is played first, followed by "Rocky Top".

“Down the Field” is also the title of the official fight song for Syracuse University, a private research university located in Syracuse, New York, United States. However, this is an entirely different song, written in 1914. The words were written by Ralph Murphy, Class of 1916; the music was composed by C. Harold Lewis, Class of 1915.

References

External links 
 Yale College fight songs, lyrics and audio, Yale College Band
 University of Tennessee fight songs, lyrics and audio
 Syracuse University fight song, lyrics and audio

Yale University
University of Tennessee
Syracuse University
American college songs
College fight songs in the United States
Atlantic Coast Conference fight songs
1914 songs